The 2014 London Sevens was the eighth and final tournament of the 2013–14 IRB Sevens World Series. This edition of the London Sevens was hosted at Twickenham Stadium in London, England.

Format
The sixteen teams competing were divided into four pools of four, who will play a round-robin within the pool. Points are awarded in each pool depending on the result; 3 for a win, 2 for a draw, 1 for a loss. The top two teams in each pool advanced to the Cup competition. The four quarterfinal losers dropped into the bracket for the Plate. The Bowl was contested by the third and fourth-place finishers in each pool, with the losers in the Bowl quarterfinals dropping into the bracket for the Shield.

Teams
The competing teams were:

Pool stage
The draw was made following the conclusion of the 2014 Scotland Sevens.

Pool A

Pool B

Pool C

Pool D

Knockout stage

Shield

Bowl

Plate

Cup

References

External links

London Sevens
London Sevens
2014
London Sevens
London Sevens